is a volcano located on the Shiretoko Peninsula in Hokkaidō, Japan. The mountain consists of non-alkali mafic rocks and andesite. Mount Shiretoko is in Shari town, in Shari District of Abashiri Subprefecture.

See Also
List of volcanoes in Japan
List of mountains in Japan

References

External links 
 Shiretoko Dake - Geological Survey of Japan
 

Mountains of Hokkaido
Volcanoes of Hokkaido
Stratovolcanoes of Japan
Pleistocene stratovolcanoes